Michael Thomas Conforto (born March 1, 1993), nicknamed "Scooter", is an American professional baseball outfielder for the San Francisco Giants of Major League Baseball (MLB). He has previously played in MLB for the New York Mets.

After Conforto played college baseball for the Oregon State Beavers, the Mets selected him in the first round of the 2014 MLB draft with the 10th overall pick. He made his MLB debut in 2015. He was an All-Star in 2017 and an All-MLB Second Team outfielder in 2020. He became a free agent after the 2021 season, but missed the 2022 season due to a shoulder injury.

High school
Conforto represented the Northwest Region in the Little League World Series in 2004. He attended Redmond High School in Redmond, Washington, where he was an honor roll student. He played shortstop on the baseball team, and quarterback and safety on the football team. In football, he was named second-team All-State. As a football player, Conforto was recruited by Ivy League schools. In baseball, he batted .310 as a sophomore, .361 as a junior (when he was All-State), and .400 as a senior (when he was named All-State and All-League). Meanwhile, Conforto received offers to play baseball at Oregon, Arizona, Arizona State, Washington, Washington State, Stanford, and Oregon State.

College
As a freshman at Oregon State University in 2012, Conforto hit .349(8th in the Pac-12)/.437(7th)/.601(1st) with 13 home runs (tied for 1st), 12 hit-by-pitch (7th), and led the Pac-12 with 76 runs batted in (RBIs) in 218 at bats over 58 games. His 76 RBIs were an Oregon State single-season record. He was named Freshman Hitter of the Year by the National Collegiate Baseball Writers Association (NCBWA) and was the Pac-12 Freshman of the Year. During the summer he played for the USA Baseball Collegiate National Team. As a sophomore in 2013, Conforto hit .328/.447(2nd)/.526(8th) with 48 runs (7th), 14 doubles (8th), 11 home runs (tied for 1st), 47 RBIs (7th), 41 walks (1st), and 14 hit-by-pitch (5th) in 247 at bats over 65 games. He helped lead the team to the College World Series, where he went 7-for-16 and was named to the All-Tournament Team. He was named the Pac-12 Player of the Year, and was named a first-team All-American by the American Baseball Coaches Association (ABCA). He again played for the USA Baseball Collegiate National Team during the summer in 2013. 

Prior to the 2014 season, he was named the preseason Sporting News College Baseball Player of the Year. Conforto finished the season hitting .345(4th)/.504(1st).547(2nd) with 52 runs (1st), 16 doubles (3rd), seven home runs (3rd), 56 RBIs (2nd), and 55 walks (1st), and 12 hit-by-pitch (9th) in 203 at bats over 59 games. He again was named the Pac-12 Baseball Player of the Year. He was also a finalist for the Golden Spikes Award and the Dick Howser Trophy.

Professional career

Minor league career

The New York Mets selected Conforto in the first round, with the 10th overall selection, of the 2014 Major League Baseball draft. Conforto signed with the Mets on July 11, 2014, receiving a $2,970,800 signing bonus. He played for the Brooklyn Cyclones of the Class A-Short Season New York–Penn League after he signed. He batted .331(5th in the league)/.403(5th)/.448	with 3 home runs, 19 RBIs, and 5 hit-by-pitch (8th) in 163 at bats. He was named a Baseball America Short-Season All Star.

Conforto started the 2015 season with the St. Lucie Mets of the Class A-Advanced Florida State League, for whom he batted .283/.350/.462(4th in the league) with 7 home runs and 28 RBIs in 206 at bats, as he led the league with six intentional walks. He was promoted to the Binghamton Mets of the Class AA Eastern League on June 26, 2015, for whom he batted .312/.396(8th in the league)/.503 with 5 home runs and 26 RBIs in 197 at bats. On July 12, 2015 at Great American Ball Park in Cincinnati, he started in left field for the United States team at the All-Star Futures Game and collected two hits and one assist. He was named an FSL Mid-Season All Star, and to the 2015 Topps Rookie All-Star team.

In 2016 with AAA Las Vegas in the Pacific Coast League Conforto batted .422(leading the PCL)/.483(first)/.727(2nd) with 30 runs, 9 home runs, and 28 RBIs with a 1.209 OPS in 128 at bats.

Major league career

New York Mets (2015–2021)
On July 24, 2015, the Mets promoted Conforto to the major leagues. He made his debut later that day, picking up his first major league RBI on a groundout, but going 0-for-3 while becoming the 1,000th player to appear in a game for the Mets. The next day, he collected his first major league hit - an RBI infield hit - as part of a four-hit game. He hit his first major-league home run on August 3 off Marlins' starter Tom Koehler. He finished the season batting .270/.335/.506 with 30 runs, 9 home runs, and 26 RBIs in 174 at bats over 56 games played, and was in the top 3% in the major leagues with a maximum exit velocity of 115.0 mph. On defense, he exclusively played left field. The Mets won the 2015 National League pennant, making Conforto the third player in history to have played in the Little League World Series, College World Series, and Major League World Series, along with pitcher Ed Vosberg and catcher Jason Varitek. Conforto hit two home runs in Game 4 of the 2015 World Series, becoming the first rookie to homer twice in a world series game since Andruw Jones in the 1996 World Series.

Entering 2016, Conforto became the Mets everyday left fielder. After a torrid start in April, Conforto began to slump once May came. From May 1 to June 25, 2016, Conforto's batting average dipped to .130. On June 25, the Mets demoted Conforto to the Las Vegas 51s of the Class AAA Pacific Coast League and called up Brandon Nimmo. He was recalled on July 18 to the Mets. After his return to the Mets, Conforto began playing both corner outfield positions. He made his major league debut in center field on July 23, 2016 as a defensive replacement. For the season, he batted .220/.310/.414 with 12 home runs and 42 RBIs in 304 at bats for the Mets, and was again in the top 3% in the major leagues with a maximum exit velocity of 115.0 mph.

Conforto started the 2017 season as the Mets fourth outfielder but worked his way to a starting job. He was selected to the 2017 MLB All-Star Game in Miami after hitting .285/.405/.548 through the first half. On August 24, his suffered a season-ending injury during a swing after he dislocated his left shoulder and tore his posterior capsule. He elected to have surgery on September 2. For the 2017 season, Conforto batted .279/.384/.555 and hit 27 home runs with 72 runs and 68 RBIs in 373 at bats. 

In 2018, Conforto hit .243/.350/.448 and led the Mets with 28 home runs, 82 RBIs, and 78 runs scored, as his 84 walks were 8th in the NL and his 159 strikeouts were 7th in the league, in 543 at bats. He had the 11th-longest home run in baseball for the season, at 472 feet.

On May 28, 2019, Conforto hit his first major league grand slam against the Los Angeles Dodgers at Dodger Stadium. He finished the season batting .257/.363/.494, with a .856 OPS, and career highs in home runs (33) and RBIs (92), as he had 84 walks (9th in the NL), in 549 at bats. 

In 2020 for the Mets, Conforto played in 54 games, batting .322(7th in the National League)/.412(6th)/.515 with 40 runs, 9 home runs, 31 RBIs, and 7 hit by pitch (6th) in 202 at bats. He was in the top 5% in the major leagues with a maximum exit velocity of 114.4 mph. He led NL outfielders in assists, with six, as on defense he exclusively played right field.

Prior to the 2021 season, the Mets offered Conforto a $100 million contract extension. He declined. 

In April 2021, Conforto was the batter during a rare walk-off hit by pitch to win a game against the Miami Marlins. The HBP call was controversial, with umpire Ron Kulpa saying after the game he felt his call was in error after reviewing the footage, and Conforto should have been charged with a strike. On September 30, Conforto was entering a game against the Miami Marlins in what could have been his final game as a Met in Citi Field. Conforto went 3-for-5 with two RBIs and a double. In the top of the ninth inning, up 12-3, Conforto made the second out of the inning with an impressive diving catch. Following the catch, Conforto received a standing ovation from the fans, despite a disappointing 2021 season. Conforto appeared to be in tears and described his emotions during the game as "something I've never really felt before", also acknowledging first base coach Tony Tarasco who held Conforto's hand up in the air before he entered the dugout. He finished the 2021 season batting .232/.344/.384 with 14 home runs and 55 RBIs in 406 at bats, with a career-worst slugging percentage and with a batting average and OPS worse than any season aside from 2016.  On defense, he exclusively played right field.

Free agency (2022)
Following the 2021 season the Mets offered him a qualifying offer (one-year for $18.4 million), which Conforto also declined and instead sought free agency. The 2021–22 Major League Baseball lockout delayed free agency talks that offseason, and Conforto started the 2022 season as a free agent. His agent, Scott Boras, later released a statement saying that an offseason shoulder injury suffered in January 2022 during a workout resulted in Conforto not starting the season with a contract. In April, Boras said that Conforto underwent right shoulder surgery and he would not play at all in 2022. Because he didn't sign with a team before the 2022 MLB draft, the Mets did not receive a compensation draft pick for Conforto rejecting their qualifying offer.

On August 31, 2022, prior to the deadline to be eligible for postseason play, Conforto was offered a two-year contract worth $30 million by the Houston Astros. He would have had to sign before midnight on the 31st to be eligible for postseason play, but chose to turn down the deal.

San Francisco Giants (2023–present)
On January 6, 2023, Conforto signed a two-year contract worth $36 million with the San Francisco Giants, containing an opt-out clause after the first season.

Personal life
His mother, Tracie Conforto (née Ruiz) is a three-time Olympic medalist in synchronized swimming, and his father, Mike, an Italian American, played inside linebacker at Penn State. His sister, Jacqueline, played soccer at Azusa Pacific University.

Conforto resides in Scottsdale, Arizona during the offseason. He is represented by Scott Boras.

See also
2013 College Baseball All-America Team

References

External links

Oregon State Beavers bio

1993 births
Living people
All-American college baseball players
American people of Italian descent
American people of Spanish descent
Baseball players from Washington (state)
Binghamton Mets players
Brooklyn Cyclones players
Las Vegas 51s players
Major League Baseball outfielders
National League All-Stars
New York Mets players
Oregon State Beavers baseball players
People from Woodinville, Washington
Sportspeople from King County, Washington
Sportspeople from Redmond, Washington
St. Lucie Mets players
United States national baseball team players
Syracuse Mets players